The Aponte conspiracy (also known as the Aponte rebellion) was a large-scale slave rebellion in Cuba that occurred in 1812. It is named after its alleged leader, José Antonio Aponte.

Precedents 
Due to the increase in use of slavery in Cuban society in the beginning of the 19th century, looking to secure the place left by Haiti as the major producer of sugar in the world, there were a series of conspiratorial attempts organized to abolish slavery. One that stood out among these occurred in 1795, where the first abolitionist conspiracy was discovered in Bayamo headed by the freedman Nicolás Morales, who when accused, fled and hid himself in Yareyal, near Holguín.

Conspiracy 
In the year 1808, Napoleon's invasion of Spain and the arrival of falsehoods around the theme of slavery caused a risky resolution on behalf of the creoles in favor of abolition. Then in 1811, in Havana, a new abolitionist conspiracy was created by the freedman José Antonio Aponte and his reaches spread all the way to Sancti Spíritus, Trinidad, Camagüey, Bayamo, Holguín and Santiago in Cuba. The person who tied the western conspiracy to the eastern part of the country was Hilario Herrera, a brave Dominican mulatto with a deeply anti-slavery consciousness and an excellent clandestine organizer. On 11 March 1812, when the plot had exploded in Camagüey, Bayamo denounced the existence of a conspiratorial group in Holguín. As a result of the investigation, more than 50 people were apprehended and at the end of the trial, the local leader was sentenced to death by hanging, a man by the name of Juan Nepomuceo who originally came from the Congo. His companions Federico, Antonio, Miguel and Manuel were all given life sentences.

Connections 
Recently, a book by Dr. Juan Antonio Hernández titled Hacia una historia de lo imposible: la revolución haitiana y el libro de pinturas de José Antonio Aponte won the Mención Especial del Premio "Casa de las Américas" 2008, in the Social History Essay category. 

The record of the declarations of José Antonio Aponte with the motive of his judicial accusation can be found edited online on the website of the Laboratorio de Desclasificación Comparada: Anales de desclasificación I:2; dossier "José Antonio Aponte y su Libro de Pinturas".

References 

1812 in Cuba
19th-century rebellions
Conflicts in 1812
Spanish colonial period of Cuba
Slave rebellions in Cuba